Sinners in Silk is a 1924 silent romantic drama film directed by Hobart Henley. The film stars Eleanor Boardman, Adolphe Menjou, Hedda Hopper, Conrad Nagel, and Jean Hersholt. It was written by Benjamin Glazer and Carey Wilson.

The film at some point may have been under the working title Free Love.

Plot
Arthur Merrill is a roué who continues to celebrate his rejuvenation surgery by taking a girl home - but she turns out to be the sweetheart of his son.

Cast

Preservation
With no copies of Sinners in Silk located in any film archives, it is a lost film.

References

External links

1924 films
Films directed by Hobart Henley
Lost American films
Metro-Goldwyn-Mayer films
American silent feature films
American black-and-white films
1924 romantic drama films
American romantic drama films
1924 lost films
1920s American films
Silent romantic drama films
Silent American drama films